Wendell & Wild is a 2022 American stop motion adult animated horror comedy film directed by Henry Selick from a screenplay written by Selick and Jordan Peele (who are also producers), based on Selick's and Clay McLeod Chapman's unpublished book of the same name. It stars Keegan-Michael Key and Jordan Peele as the titular characters with Angela Bassett, Lyric Ross, James Hong, and Ving Rhames in supporting roles. This was Selick's first feature film since Coraline (2009).

Selick began developing his stop-motion animation feature with Key and Peele set to star in November 2015. The distributor rights were picked up by Netflix in March 2018. Other voice cast were confirmed in March 2022. Production was done remotely during the COVID-19 pandemic, with filming taking place in Portland, Oregon.

It premiered at the 47th Toronto International Film Festival on September 11, 2022, was released in select cinemas on October 21, 2022, and made its streaming release in Netflix on October 28, 2022. It received generally positive reviews from critics who welcomed Selick's return and praised its stop-motion animation and characters, but criticized its screenplay. The film is dedicated to Mark Musumeci, an electricity consultant who worked on almost all of Selick's previous stop-motion features since The Nightmare Before Christmas, who died during production.

Plot
Eight year old Katherine "Kat" Elliot lives with her parents Delroy and Wilma, who own a root beer brewery in the town of Rust Bank. Driving home on a stormy night, Kat is frightened by a two-headed worm in her candy apple, leading her father to veer off a bridge; only Kat survives after her mother sacrifices her life to save her. Meanwhile, in the underworld, demon brothers Wendell and Wild spend their days putting rejuvenating hair cream on their balding father, Buffalo Belzer, while dreaming of making an amusement park, the Dream Fair, for departed souls to challenge Belzer's "Scream Fair". Wild continuously steals the hair cream by eating it for its hallucinogenic effect, much to Wendell's annoyance, but Wild manages to change Wendell's mind by force-feeding him the cream. The cream causes the brothers to have a vision of Kat.

Five years later, Kat is an embittered, punk rock-loving thirteen year old juvenile delinquent who blames herself for her parents' deaths. Kat is enrolled in Rust Bank's all-girls Catholic school, headed by Father Bests. A trio of preppy classmates attempt to befriend Kat. The group is led by Siobhan Klaxon, whose parents Lane and Irmgard's private prison company Klaxon "Klax" Korp has taken over the town. Kat unintentionally endears herself to Siobhan by saving her from a falling brick, which she anticipated through premonition, surprising herself. Later, she meets Raúl Cocolotl, a trans boy who was once friends with Siobhan and the one who accidentally broke the brick that nearly landed on Siobhan. Raúl's mother, Marianna, is convinced the Klaxons are the reason the brewery burned down and caused it to kill all of its workers. During a class taught by Sister Helley, Kat receives a marking on her hand resembling a skull when she approached Helley's desk, which Helley tells her she must hide and tell no one. The mark alerts Wendell and Wild from a possessed stuffed-bear called Bearzebub, who marks her from Helley's desk, identifying Kat as their "hell maiden", and they appear to her in a dream and make an empty promise to revive her parents, although demons can not resurrect the dead, if she summons them to the world of the living.

Kat steals Bearzebub from Helley's desk needed to summon Wendell and Wild. Helley, once a hell maiden herself, works with the school's janitor and secret demon hunter, Manberg "the Merciless", who hunts demons and keeps them in jars. Father Bests is revealed to be in league with the Klaxons, who kill him as the last witness to their factory fire. After his funeral, Kat recruits Raúl as her witness to summon the demon brothers, who brought their father's hair cream with them after they discovered that it can bring dead organisms back to life. However, by the taking the wrong way, the brothers appear in another part of the cemetery, and Kat believes she has been stood up.

Wendell and Wild test the cream on Bests, who comes back to life and convinces the Klaxons to pay the brothers to revive the deceased members of the town council. This will give the Klaxons the votes they need to demolish the town and expand their prisons, but, fearing they could resurrect anyone else in the cemetery, where the other witnesses of the brewery arson, the burned brew workers, are too, the Klaxons tell Wendell and Wild that if they revive Kat's parents or any dead people, including the witnesses, in the cemetery, they won't pay for their fair or for the school. Bests returns to school, and Kat confronts the brothers, who make her vow to serve them forever in exchange for her parents' resurrection but it is just a ruse to make sure that they won’t resurrect anyone in the cemetery. Forced to dig up the council members, whom Wendell and Wild revive, Raúl steals the cream and revives Delroy and Wilma himself. Reunited with her parents, Kat helps Raúl escape the brothers. 

After the zombie council approves the Klaxons' plans and pay Bests, Wendell, and Wild with a bag full of money, Siobhan discovers her parents' lies about the conditions of their prisons. Helley and Manberg make Kat undergo a ritual called soul binding, confronting her memories and severing her allegiance with Wendell and Wild, resulting in her accepting the fact that her parents' death was not her fault. The soul binding ritual further gives her the control of her precognitive powers, which Helley reveals are a consequence of her status as a hell maiden. After learning of their resurrection, Bests, Wendell, and Wild kidnap Delroy and Wilma and take them to the cemetery to kill them until Kat, Raúl, Helley, and Manberg stop them, where Siobhan, who followed her pet pygmy goat Gabby Goat to the cemetery, reveals that her parents paid Bests, Wendell, and Wild worthless company money. Buffalo Belzer appears, having discovered Wendell and Wild's deception, but a mural painted by Raúl as his art project, depicting his mother Marianna, as a mighty Mayan warrior, defending and protecting a baby Raúl against a two-headed dragon (representing the Klaxons) painted part-by-part on every house's roof in Rust Bank, convinces him to make up with his sons. Manberg releases his collection of jarred demons after learning they are Belzer's children in exchange for Kat and the others. Belzer apologizes to Wendell and Wild, approving their plans for a new fair. Bests dies again, and Belzer explains that the cream's effects are only temporary, and reveals the strands of hair Wendell and Wild have been planting on his head would have fallen off anyway.

Kat says it's too late to save Rust Bank, but Sister Helley tells her she can change the future since she knows what happens in it. Recalling that Raúl said there needs to be a witness to prove the Klaxons are guilty, Kat tells him to use the very last bit of cream to revive some dead brew workers. The group fends off the bulldozers conducted by the zombie council to demolish the town while Raúl revives three dead factory workers to testify to the Klaxons' crimes, resulting in their arrest. The cream's effect begin to wear off on Delroy and Wilma, but before they die, Kat uses her precognition to give them a glimpse of the future where Rust Bank is revived, and Wendell and Wild offer them VIP passes to their afterlife fair. Kat makes peace with her life, considering everyone her friends, even Wendell and Wild themselves.

In a post-credits scene, one of the production members finds an  anthropomorphic model of Kat walking around his office desk.

Voice cast

Production

Development

On November 3, 2015, it was reported that Henry Selick was developing Wendell & Wild, a new stop-motion feature with Keegan-Michael Key and Jordan Peele, based on an original story by Selick. On March 14, 2018, the film was picked up by Netflix. In a July 2019 interview, Key described the voice acting process, where "Jordan and I came in and did a session against static at recording booths, sitting looking across at Jordan and it's lots of ideas flowing, cutting each other off to keep that organic feeling. That usually ends up on the cutting room floor as you find the voices and you want a little refinement–some rhythm. We spent a good deal of time with an initial scene that Henry wrote discovering the characters and the framework of the scene. And then he uses that as inspiration to keep writing". Pablo Lobato served as lead designer on the stop-motion puppets. On June 4, 2020, Bruno Coulais was confirmed as the composer. On March 14, 2022, the cast was revealed by Netflix on YouTube.

Animation
As of June 15, 2020, production was being done remotely during the COVID-19 pandemic. Lead writer and voice actor Peele stated that he "had an absolute blast working with Henry Selick and the crew for Wendell & Wild. I cannot wait for you to discover this film". In an October 8, 2020 interview with The Hollywood Reporter, the film's producer, Gotham Group CEO Ellen Goldsmith-Vein, elaborated on the project: "We're mid-production in Portland, Oregon, where the crew has suffered through fires, most recently, COVID and a lot of political and social unrest. It's been a very challenging movie." Editing was done by Robert Anich, and Peter Sorg was cinematographer. By February 2021, production was ongoing in Portland.

After Coraline, Selick felt stop-motion animation had become so smooth it had become indistinguishable from computer animation, defeating some of the purpose of stop-motion. He decided to allow flaws, such as keeping the seam lines on replacement faces visible, and shooting fewer frames per second in some scenes. Except for a stop-motion software  called Dragonframe, he used more or less the same types of tools and techniques he used in Coraline more than a decade earlier.

Part of the film was done as cutout animation to make the puppets look more two-dimensional. They were made of tin coated with silicone. Inspired by the shadow-puppet animation in Harry Potter and the Deathly Hallows – Part 1, and an idea originally intended for Selick's yet-to-be-made stop-motion film The Shadow King, some of Wendell & Wild was done as silhouette animation, utilizing a combination of physical cutouts and CGI, with CGI used when cutouts were too limiting.

Music
The film's score is composed by Bruno Coulais. Its soundtrack has been noted for its emphasis on Afro-punk bands, and includes the songs "Ma and Pa" by Fishbone; "Germfree Adolescents" and "I Am a Poseur" by X-Ray Spex; "Ghost Town" by the Specials; "River" by Ibeyi; "The Wolf" by the Brat; "You Sexy Thing" by Hot Chocolate; "Young, Gifted, Black, in Leather" by Special Interest; "Freakin' Out" by Death; "Fall Asleep" by Big Joanie; "Cult of Personality" by Living Colour; "Wolf Like Me" by TV on the Radio; "Boot" by Tamar-kali; and "Raising the Dead" and "Scream Faire" by Coulais.

Speaking about the film's soundtrack, Selick stated:
Before Afro-punk, there was Fishbone. There was actually several black punk bands. Fishbone was punk, ska, funk. But I ended up meeting those guys, who are still performing, and we have one of their songs in the film. They're still performing now, but I met them in the 1980s. And I wrote and directed a music video of one of their songs called "Party at Ground Zero"... And then there's all these other pioneers of the time that, some are forgotten, some are remembered, especially with the Afro-punk movement, they're remembered. But there was bands, you know, Death, Pure Hell. The Brat, which was a Chicano band, actually, in L.A. Poly Styrene of X-Ray Spex. Bad Brains. Fishbone.

Producer Win Rosenfeld suggested the use of Fishbone's "Ma and Pa" as a means of "building that bridge, sonically" between the characters of Kat and her parents.

Release

Wendell & Wild premiered at the Toronto International Film Festival on September 11, 2022 and was released in select theaters on October 21, 2022, before its release on Netflix on October 28, 2022. 

On November 6, 2018, Netflix announced that it would be available for streaming in 2021. On July 18, 2019, Key announced the film was planned to be released in late 2020. On January 14, 2021, Netflix CEO Ted Sarandos revealed that the release would be moved to "2022 or later" to meet Netflix's criteria of releasing six animated features per year. Simon & Schuster would adapt the screenplay to novel form, to tie into the film's release.

Reception

Critical reception
 

Chase Hutchinson of Collider, gave a positive review, saying, "when it all comes together, Wendell & Wild ends up feeling liberating, both artistically and thematically, with top work from all involved." Sarah Bea Milner, of /Film, also gave a positive review, writing, "move over The Nightmare Before Christmas — there's a new stop-motion horror flick in town." Michael Rechtshaffen, of The Hollywood Reporter, further praised the film for being "a fresh, highly original concoction of playful Grand Guignol proportions." Radheyan Simonpillai, of The Guardian, wrote "the more characters Selick has to work with, the more room there is for his deliciously strange and comic visual craft." In a positive review, for RogerEbert.com, Brian Tallerico wrote "there's no denying that this is a world that animation fans will just want to explore, to live in, to savor. It's been too long since we got a window into Henry Selick's brain and it's still an amazing view."

Meagan Navarro, of Bloody Disgusting, gave a lukewarm review, writing, "it's an entertaining, if a bit overstuffed, romp through hell and back, with memorable characters and amusingly macabre hijinks." Esther Zuckerman, writing for Vanity Fair, said the film "is slightly too convoluted with some world-building short-changed, but it twists and turns to a place of genuine emotion and a rousing call to take down the ghouls of the real world rather than the demons of the underworld." The Playlist's Jason Bailey praised the characters and stop-motion animation, assigning the film a grade of "B-" but ultimately concluding: "If it were a might tighter (it runs a rather flabby 105 minutes), or more rapidly paced, they might've really had something here; the highs are high, but Selick struggles to keep its narrative momentum going".

Accolades

References

External links

2020s American animated films
2020s stop-motion animated films
2022 animated films
2022 comedy horror films
2022 fantasy films
2022 films
American comedy horror films
American dark fantasy films
American adult animated films
Demons in film
2020s monster movies
English-language Netflix original films
Films about Catholic nuns
Films directed by Henry Selick
Films produced by Jordan Peele
Films scored by Bruno Coulais
Films shot in Portland, Oregon
Films with screenplays by Jordan Peele
Netflix Animation films
2022 LGBT-related films
LGBT-related animated films
American LGBT-related films
Transgender-related films
Stop-motion animated films
2020s English-language films
LGBT-related horror films